Chryseobacterium hispalense  is a Gram-negative and non-motile bacteria from the genus of Chryseobacterium which has been isolated from a rainwater pond in Spain. Chryseobacterium hispalense can promote plant growth.

References

Further reading

External links
Type strain of Chryseobacterium hispalense at BacDive -  the Bacterial Diversity Metadatabase

hispalense
Bacteria described in 2013